Eric Charles Grey (1 May 1895 – 2 May 1977) was a New Zealand rugby league player. A , Grey represented Auckland at a provincial level, and was a member of the New Zealand national team in 1920. He played two test matches for New Zealand against England. In 1921 he played for Maritime against City Rovers in the first ever game on Carlaw Park and kicked the first goal on the ground. In 1922 Maritime changed their name to Athletic. Grey was something of a drop goal specialist and in 1922 alone he kicked 5 for Athletics when in some seasons there were none kicked in the club competition at all. His son, Ian Grey, also played rugby league for New Zealand. In 1923 Grey transferred to the Ponsonby United team. He played for them in 1923 and 1924 before retiring.

He came out of retirement during the 1926 season and played for them again in 1927.

References

1895 births
1977 deaths
Rugby league players from Auckland
New Zealand rugby league players
New Zealand national rugby league team players
Auckland rugby league team players
Maritime Football Club players
Ponsonby Ponies players
Rugby league wingers